Żurawce  is a village in the administrative district of Gmina Lubycza Królewska, within Tomaszów Lubelski County, Lublin Voivodeship, in eastern Poland, close to the border with Ukraine. The village is located in the historical region Galicia.

Notable people
Władysław Kowalski (1936–2017), actor

References

Villages in Tomaszów Lubelski County